42 is a private institution of higher education in computer science school founded by Xavier Niel, Nicolas Sadirac (former executive director at Epitech), Kwame Yamgnane, and Florian Bucher (former executives at Epitech). The school opened in Paris in 2013. The school does not have any professors and is open 24/7. Students are trained through peer-to-peer, pedagogy, and project-based learning.

42's name is a reference to the book The Hitchhiker's Guide to the Galaxy written by British author Douglas Adams: in the book, 42 is the Answer to the Ultimate Question of Life, the Universe, and Everything.

In addition to the two official campuses in Paris, France, and Fremont, California, the school model was adopted in Lyon, Reims, and Mulhouse, France, as well as in Romania, South Africa, Ukraine, Bulgaria, Moldova, Belgium, Russia, Morocco, the Netherlands, Indonesia, Finland, Germany, Adelaide, Australia, Armenia, the United Arab Emirates, London, Quebec, Canada, Bangkok, Lausanne Switzerland and Turkey.

History 

Announced on March 26, 2013, 42 was opened on July 15, 2013, for the selection phase called La Piscine (the swimming-pool). The original Fremont campus was closed in 2020 due to issues with campus management.

On May 17, 2016, 42 announced plans to open a second campus in Fremont, California. The second US location was never opened.

As of 2023, 47 campuses have been opened in 26 countries.

Endorsements 

42 already had big supporters in tech like Snapchat CEO Evan Spiegel, Twitter and Square CEO Jack Dorsey, and Slack CEO Stewart Butterfield. Spiegel called it a school from the future, and Dorsey gave a glowing endorsement, saying "We are always looking for great engineers from any background and any education like 42."

Paul Graham founder of Y combinator stated on Twitter "My God is 42 impressive. This is not another programming bootcamp. It's another MIT."

Operation 
The mode of operation of 42 was notably inspired by that of Epitech  : selection using "swimming pool" sessions and teaching according to the project mode

Admission and registration 
The candidate must be at least 18 years old or hold a baccalaureate (it is possible to start an application for candidates in the year of their baccalaureate). No diploma is required for applicants over 18 years of age. In 2015, an experiment took place with Pôle Emploi to train a group of around thirty unemployed seniors in programming for ten months . This training has since been renewed each year.

The first selection is made using a series of logic and memory tests on the institution's website intended to assess the students' abilities to learn computer science. The second selection is called the “pool”. It is an intensive four-week selection process during which the applicant must carry out practical work in the C Language language as well as community service , sometimes considered by students as a degrading punishment. Under the eye of the educational team who scrutinizes all their actions from the jar (office of the educational team) using big data.

Registration for training is free and concerns each year about 850 students in Paris.

Particularities of the training 
There are no lectures or practical work supervised by professors. Students are free to organize their days to carry out the projects proposed by the teaching team. The establishment is open 24 hours a day, 7 days a week.

The training provided is intended to be inspired by the changes brought about by the Internet with a pedagogy qualified as "peer to peer". Depending on the course chosen by the student, it delivers an RNCP title of level 6 or level 7 or a certificate not recognized by the French State.

Program 

The first projects are mainly focused on development in C language in a UNIX platform environment . Depending on their level, the student can enroll in two-week educational “pools” to discover new programming paradigms: web in PHP , object-oriented in C++ , functional in OCaml and Unity . Other projects introduce students to computer security , mobile development and the network [ref. necessary] .

Business model 
The investment was made by Xavier Niel: 70 million euros, including 20 million for the creation of the Parisian establishment and 50 million to cover its operating costs for 10 years. The objective when creating 42 is to allow the creation of 150 companies each year, including five Internet giants, in the hope that these young shoots pay their apprenticeship tax to the establishment. At the start of 2015, Nicolas Sadirac said "If we are not able to generate five big successes per year, it is because we will have failed. Then there will be no more reason to finance us."

42 Network 
42 Network is a network of partner institutions funded by institutions, companies and investors around the world. In 2020, Sophie Vigier announced that 33 establishments are open on 5 continents and in 22 countries. The educational curriculum of these establishments is based on a common core, but the campuses can adapt their projects to the labor pools in which they are located.

On December 6, 2017, Xavier Niel announces the creation of a 42 school in Algiers, during Emmanuel Macron's visit to Algeria. This announcement has not yet been followed by an opening.

In 2018 Corinne Vigreux announced to open Codam coding college as part of 42 in Amsterdam.

In June 2019, 42 announced the opening of eleven new campuses by 2020, including 42 Rio, 42 São Paulo, 42 Jakarta, 42 Yerevan, 42 Tokyo, 42 Bogota, 42 Angoulême, 42 Madrid, and 42 Quebec.

References

External links 
  
  

Universities and colleges in France
Educational institutions established in 2013
Education in Paris
2013 establishments in France
Education in the Netherlands
Coding schools
International schools
International college and university associations and consortia